"Ready to Start" is a single from Arcade Fire's third album The Suburbs. It was released as a single on October 3, 2010. The band performed "Ready to Start" as their second performance at the 53rd Grammy Awards, immediately following The Suburbs winning Album of the Year. The band also performed the song at the Brit Awards several days after the Grammy Awards.

Music video
A music video was made for the single and was uploaded to YouTube on August 26, 2010. The video shows the band performing the song in a concert event as part of their world tour.

Credits and personnel
 Win Butler – lead vocals, guitar
 Régine Chassagne – backing vocals, drums
 Richard Reed Parry – guitar, string arrangements
 Tim Kingsbury – bass
 William Butler – keyboards, guitar
 Sarah Neufeld – violin, backing vocals, string arrangements
 Jeremy Gara – drums
 Owen Pallett – string arrangements
 Marika Anthony Shaw – string arrangements
 Arcade Fire and Markus Dravs – producers
 Craig Silvey and Nick Launay – mixing

Chart performance
"Ready to Start" peaked at number 67 on the UK Singles Chart, the band's highest placement since "Keep the Car Running" peaked at number 56 in 2007. The song also peaked at number 16 on the Billboard Alternative Songs chart, the band's highest placement on that chart at the time, surpassing the number 32 placement of "Keep the Car Running" when the chart was known under its original name of Modern Rock Tracks. In 2017, their single "Everything Now" would outpeak the song's ranking on the chart, reaching number 12 there. Additionally, the single peaked at number 25 on the Billboard Rock Songs chart, and in the band's native Canada, at number 49.

References

External links
 Official website

2010 singles
Arcade Fire songs
Merge Records singles
Song recordings produced by Markus Dravs
2010 songs
Songs written by William Butler (musician)
Songs written by Win Butler
Songs written by Régine Chassagne
Songs written by Jeremy Gara
Songs written by Tim Kingsbury
Songs written by Richard Reed Parry